Dehnow-e Sang (also Romanized as Dehnow Sang; also known as Deh-i-Nau, Deh Nan, Deh Now, Dehnow, and Dehnow’īyeh) is a village in Siriz Rural District, Yazdanabad District, Zarand County, Kerman Province, Iran. At the 2006 census, its population was 489, in 119 families.

References 

Populated places in Zarand County